Heathcliff is a fictional character in Emily Brontë's 1847 novel Wuthering Heights. Owing to the novel's enduring fame and popularity, he is often regarded as an archetype of the tortured antihero whose all-consuming rage, jealousy and anger destroy both him and those around him; in short, the Byronic hero.

He is better known for being a romantic hero due to his youthful love for Catherine Earnshaw, than for his final years of vengeance in the second half of the novel, during which he grows into a bitter, haunted man, and for a number of incidents in his early life that suggest that he was an upset and sometimes malicious individual from the beginning. His complicated, mesmerizing, absorbing, and altogether bizarre nature makes him a rare character, incorporating elements of both the hero and villain. Actors who have portrayed Heathcliff on screen include Laurence Olivier, Timothy Dalton, Richard Burton, Ralph Fiennes and Tom Hardy.

Character 
You teach me now how cruel you've been—cruel and false!  Why did you despise me?  Why did you betray your own heart, Cathy?  I have not one word of comfort.  You deserve this.  You have killed yourself.  Yes, you may kiss me, and cry; and wring out my kisses and tears: they'll blight you—they'll damn you.  You loved me—then what right had you to leave me?  What right—answer me—for the poor fancy you felt for Linton?  Because misery, and degradation, and death, and nothing God or Satan could inflict would have parted us, you, of your own will, did it.  I have not broken your heart—you have broken it; and in breaking it, you have broken mine.  So much the worse for me, that I am strong.  Do I want to live?  What kind of living will it be when you—oh, God! would you like to live with your soul in the grave?

A foundling discovered on the streets of Liverpool and raised by the Earnshaw family of Wuthering Heights in Yorkshire, Heathcliff's past and early childhood before his mysterious adoption are only hinted at by Brontë. In keeping with the supernatural themes present in the novel, it is speculated that Heathcliff might be a demon or a hellish soul. His appearance would be faithfully interpreted as resembling a Roma, or Gypsy, as he is described with dark hair, dark eyes, and dark skin. Later in life, he becomes a gentleman "in dress and aspect." Nelly Dean states that he could be an "American castaway." Heathcliff may have been of mixed race because he is described in the original book as a "dark-skinned gipsy" and "a little Lascar" – a 19th-century term for Indian sailors. In Chapter Four, Heathcliff is described by Mr Earnshaw to be "as dark almost as if it came from the devil." In Chapter Seven, Nelly Dean asks of him “Who knows but your father was Emperor of China, and your mother an Indian queen?”

A silent and at first, a solitary child, Heathcliff is initially resented by both Catherine Earnshaw and her elder brother, Hindley; while Catherine later befriends and loves Heathcliff, Hindley continues to resent him, seeing him as an interloper who has stolen his father's affection. Upon Mr Earnshaw's death and his inheritance of the estate, the spiteful Hindley proceeds to treat Heathcliff as little more than a servant boy and makes him work the fields, which compounds Heathcliff's lifelong anger and resentment. Catherine, however, remains close to her foster brother throughout her early years.

As she matures into her young teens, however, Catherine grows close to Edgar Linton, a timid and well-bred young man from the neighbouring estate, Thrushcross Grange, and accepts his proposal of marriage; but, she insists that her true and only love is Heathcliff. She claims that she cannot marry him because it "would degrade her" and that the two would be beggars were such a union to take place. Nevertheless, she also declares her passion for him in such ways as "whatever our souls are made of, his and mine are the same", and the famous quote "I am Heathcliff." Aware only of Catherine's decision to marry Edgar, rather than her proclamation of true love for him, a bitter Heathcliff leaves Wuthering Heights upon overhearing her saying that it would degrade her and while away, by means unknown, makes his fortune.

Nelly Dean describes him as "lazy" when he returns and that his "upright carriage suggested his being in the army." No other hints are given about where Heathcliff was and how he made his fortune over the course of his three-year absence. On returning, he is ruthlessly determined to destroy those who degraded him and prevented him from being with Catherine, cementing his status as an anti-hero, rather than a romantic hero. Not only does he swindle Hindley, who has fallen into alcoholism and gambling after the death of his wife, Frances, out of his ownership of Wuthering Heights and Hindley's son's inheritance; he heartlessly takes advantage of Edgar Linton's sister Isabella and marries her, before treating her in a cruel and contemptuous fashion. Although he tells Catherine that he despises Isabella and would "cut (his own) throat" if he imagined Catherine wanted him to marry Edgar's younger sister, his and Isabella's marriage promises to result in his inheriting Thrushcross Grange on Linton's death. This can only be achieved, however, by Heathcliff's forcing his and Isabella's son Linton into marriage with Catherine's daughter, who is called Cathy.

After Catherine Earnshaw's death, Heathcliff's vindictive cruelty intensifies, aimed at destroying not only his enemies but also their heirs — Hareton, son of Hindley and Frances Earnshaw, and Catherine, daughter of Edgar Linton and Catherine the elder. Heathcliff forces his sickly son, Linton, who entirely resembles his mother, Isabella, into marriage with Catherine Linton, daughter of Cathy and Edgar, in a bid to gain control of Thrushcross Grange. Shortly after the two are married in their nearly loveless match, the insipid Linton dies, hardly a surprise to either his father or his widow. Heathcliff treats Catherine with relative mercy, turning her into a cold, distant creature, far removed from the bright, lively girl she used to be. Hareton and Catherine eventually fall in love, however, and their relationship in some ways mirrors and in others opposes that between Heathcliff and the elder Catherine. Their union breaks the cycle of hatred at Wuthering Heights, and Heathcliff no longer cares to continue his vendetta. Hareton, resembling his aunt Catherine Earnshaw much in looks, creates a sense of uneasiness for Heathcliff: Brontë often implies that he has secret regard for Hareton and that Hareton sees Heathcliff as his true father since Heathcliff raised him. The novel ends with the death of Heathcliff, who has become a broken, tormented man, haunted by the ghost of the elder Catherine, next to whom he demands to be buried. His corpse is initially found by Nelly Dean, who, peeping into his room, spots him. Heathcliff grows restless towards the very end of the novel and stops eating. Nelly Dean does not believe that he had the intention to commit suicide, but that his starvation may have been the cause of his death. He wanted to be with Cathy in eternal life.

laid on his back.  His eyes met mine so keen and fierce, I started, and then he seemed to smile.  I could not think him dead: but his face and throat were washed with rain; the bed-clothes dripped, and he was perfectly still.  The lattice, flapping to and fro, had grazed one hand that rested on the sill; no blood trickled from the broken skin, and when I put my fingers to it, I could doubt no more: he was dead and stark!

The implication is that Catherine, having earlier haunted Mr Lockwood at his window, has made a similar visitation on Heathcliff, bearing him away with her so that they may be together beyond the grave, which has long been Heathcliff's aspiration. Nelly relates his revealing admission:

"I got the sexton, who was digging Linton's grave, to remove the earth off her coffin lid, and I opened it.  I thought, once, I would have stayed there, when I saw her face again — it is hers yet — he had hard work to stir me; but he said it would change if the air blew on it, and so I struck one side of the coffin loose and covered it up — not Linton's side, damn him! I wish he'd been soldered in lead — and I bribed the sexton to pull it away, when I'm laid there, and slide mine out too.  I'll have it made so, and then, by the time Linton gets to us, he'll not know which is which!"
"You were very wicked, Mr Heathcliff!" I exclaimed; "were you not ashamed to disturb the dead?"

At the very close of the novel, a servant boy tells Nelly that he has seen the ghosts of Heathcliff and Catherine walking the moors together, although Nelly and Lockwood both insist that they must be treated as if their souls were at peace.  The novel closes with Lockwood wandering past their graves and wondering "how anyone could ever imagine unquiet slumbers for the sleepers in that quiet earth."

As Charlotte Brontë, Emily's older sister wrote, "Heathcliff, indeed, stands unredeemed; never once swerving in his arrow-straight course to perdition", which adds to the uncertainty over whether he not only repented for his sins but was actually a real human being after all; since Lockwood's vision of Catherine at the window was preceded by a dream of a fire-and-brimstone sermon in a church, it is possible that both Heathcliff and Catherine are damned; Catherine herself expresses doubt as to whether she could ever be admitted into Heaven. However, A Companion to the Brontës states "Charlotte seems to most willfully "misread" Emily’s tale in order to repackage it to a polite society", adding "Wuthering Heights is the very opposite of a linear novel, and there is nothing whatsoever "arrow-straight" about Heathcliff." The uncertain fate of Heathcliff's soul, combined with the mystery that Heathcliff's character leaves behind, ends the novel in a mesmerizing, eerie way, justifying Heathcliff's enduring status as an iconic anti-hero of literature.

Depictions

In 1939, Laurence Olivier portrayed Heathcliff in Wuthering Heights, directed by William Wyler. He received an Oscar nomination for Best Actor for his performance.

Indian actor Dilip Kumar played localized versions of the character in three film adaptations of the novel Arzoo (1950), Hulchul (1951) and Dil Diya Dard Liya (1966).

In 1958, Richard Burton played Heathcliff in "Wuthering Heights", a 90-minute television episode of the anthology series DuPont Show of the Month. In 1970, Timothy Dalton portrayed Heathcliff in Wuthering Heights, directed by Robert Fuest.

Ralph Fiennes's portrayal of Heathcliff in 1992's Emily Brontë's Wuthering Heights marked the second film adaptation to attempt to involve Hareton and Cathy in the story as well. The first attempt was made in a 1920 silent film now believed to be lost. ITV's 1998 TV drama, which had Robert Cavanah in the starring role, also told the full story.

In 1997, Cliff Richard played Heathcliff in a stage musical. Focusing mainly on the life of Heathcliff, his quest to win Cathy, and his life after her death. The music is by John Farrar and lyrics are by Sir Tim Rice. Cliff Richard released the movie Heathcliff in 1997 and it was such a success that he brought it to the Birmingham stage in 1998.

Masterpiece Theatre presented a 2009 two-part series of Wuthering Heights starring Tom Hardy as Heathcliff. In this version, the second-generation characters play a key role, and the telling of the story begins and ends with them.

In 2011, director Andrea Arnold directed a film adaptation starring James Howson as Heathcliff.

In popular culture 
"Wuthering Heights", a single from Kate Bush's 1978 debut album, The Kick Inside, is told from the perspective of a ghostly Catherine Earnshaw visiting an aged Heathcliff.

In her song "David Duchovny," Bree Sharp refers to David Duchovny as "American Heathcliff, brooding and comely."

In July 2008, the then British Prime Minister, Gordon Brown, compared himself to the character, saying that he was "Maybe an older Heathcliff, a wiser Heathcliff." The comparison was mocked by some. For example, Andrew McCarthy, acting director of the Brontë Parsonage Museum, said that "Heathcliff is a man prone to domestic violence, kidnapping, possible murder and digging up his dead lover. He is moody and unkind to animals. Is this really a good role model for the prime minister?"

The opening track to the UK melodic hard rock band Ten's eleventh studio album Albion, "Alone in the Dark", is based on Heathcliff's internal struggles as depicted in Wuthering Heights.

Notes

References 

Characters in Wuthering Heights
Drama film characters
Fictional ghosts
Fictional suicides
Orphan characters in literature
Romance film characters
Fictional Romani people